Love Place is the fourth album by Japanese singer and songwriter Kana Nishino. It was released on September 5, 2012. It won Best Album at the 54th Japan Record Awards. It debuted and peaked at number two on the Oricon Albums Chart.

Track listing

Limited edition DVD
Video Clips Vol.4

Charts

References

Kana Nishino albums
SME Records albums
2012 albums